Lake Haapajärvi is a middle size lake in the area of Iisalmi, Northern Savonia, Finland. There are 38 lakes with the name Haapajärvi in Finland, with this particular lake being the largest in size.

See also
List of lakes in Finland

References
 Finnish Environment Institute: Lakes in Finland
 Etelä-Savon ympäristökeskus: Saimaa, nimet ja rajaukset 

Lakes of Iisalmi